Janusz Ryszard Korwin-Mikke (born 27 October 1942), also known by his initials JKM or simply as Korwin, is a Polish far-right politician, paleolibertarian and author. He was a member of the European Parliament from 2014 until 2018. He was the leader of the Congress of the New Right (KNP), which was formed in 2011 from Liberty and Lawfulness, which he led from its formation in 2009, and the Real Politics Union, which he led from 1990 to 1997 and from 1999 to 2003. Currently, he is the chairman of the party KORWiN, and since 2019 he is a member of the Sejm, elected from the electoral list of Confederation Liberty and Independence.

Biography

Birth 
Janusz Korwin-Mikke was born in German-occupied Warsaw on 27 October 1942. He was the only child of Ryszard Mikke and Maria Rosochacka. His father was the head of an engineering department of the State Aviation Works. After the death of his mother during the Warsaw Uprising in 1944, he was under the care of his grandmother and later stepmother. Janusz Korwin-Mikke's great-grandfather was Gustaw Izydor Mikke aka Mücke, son of Samuel Beniamin Mücke (who was a brewer in Kielce) and grandson of Samuel Mücke.

Detainment by communists 
Korwin-Mikke studied at the Faculty of Mathematics and Faculty of Philosophy of the Warsaw University. For his anti-communist activities, in 1964 he was detained by the communist authorities while studying psychology, law, philosophy and sociology. During the 1968 Polish political crisis, he was again arrested, jailed and expelled from the university for his participation in student protests. Despite his anti-communist activities, JKM was reinstated and allowed to finish his studies with the dean Klemens Szaniawski. He successfully defended his master thesis Metodologiczne aspekty poglądów Stephena Toulmina (eng. Methodological aspects of Stephen Toulmin's views), written under the guide of Henryk Jankowski.

Meeting with Milton Friedman 
Korwin-Mikke met with Milton Friedman when Friedman toured Europe advocating free-market policies. Friedman wrote about Janusz Korwin-Mikke in his memoirs:

Far-right politics 
From 1962 to 1982 he was a member of the Democratic Party. In August 1980 he supported the political strike of the Szczecin Shipyard workers, and later he was an adviser of NSZZ Rzemieślników Indywidualnych "Solidarność" (Independent Craftsmen's Union). In 1987 he founded a national conservative, economically liberal political party called Ruch Polityki Realnej (Movement of Real Politics), later renamed - Unia Polityki Realnej (UPR, Union of Real Politics).

In 1990 he established a weekly paper Najwyższy Czas! (About Time!).

Korwin-Mikke was a member of Parliament during the first term of the Sejm of the Third Republic of Poland. He was the originator of the vetting resolution on 28 May 1992, which obliged the Minister of Internal Affairs to disclose the names of all politicians who had been communist secret police agents. The disclosed list contained numerous prominent politicians of most political factions. This led to the government being overthrown by the opposition and the President Lech Walesa.

He was his party's candidate in Polish presidential elections, obtaining 2.4% votes in 1995, 1.43% in 2000, 1,4% in 2005, 2.48% in 2010, 3.3% in 2015. In 2018 he co-founded a eurosceptic political party Konfederacja. In 2019 he was elected for deputy in the lower chamber of Polish Parliament (Sejm). He is a self-declared monarchist who claims that democracy is "the most stupid form of government ever conceived". Janusz Korwin-Mikke is a former professional contract bridge player. He has authored, together with Andrzej Macieszczak, a popular book on the subject.

In 2008, his blog was the most popular political blog in Poland.

He frequently refers to such figures as Frédéric Bastiat, Alexis de Tocqueville, Friedrich Hayek, Milton Friedman, Margaret Thatcher.

Controversies 
Korwin-Mikke has been described as a "perpetual political gadfly" by Politico, and as "a colorful and abrasive character" by The Guardian.

Charlie Hebdo shooting 
At the plenary session of the European Parliament held after the assault at Charlie Hebdo, Korwin-Mikke expressed his dissatisfaction with the public reaction to those events by stating 'I am not Charlie. I am for death penalty' and presenting it to the public instead of a sign 'Je suis Charlie' held by the other MEPs.

Allegations of sexism 
In 1991 Korwin-Mikke published his guidebook for men, "Father's Vademecum", in which he wrote many pieces of advice that have been recognized as highly controversial and sexist, such as "If you cannot resolve conflict with your wife in any way, if you cannot convince her, then, unfortunately, you have to use physical force."

He believes that women are, on average, less intelligent than men, citing chess results to back up his claims. He has cited Margaret Thatcher as his political model. He stated that the difference between rape and consensual sex is very subtle, even going as far as saying that "Were you to understand woman's nature, sir, you would know that there is an element of rape in every sexual intercourse". He further claimed that: "there is a hypothesis that the attitudes of men are passed to women they sleep with".

On 1 March 2017, Korwin-Mikke sparked controversy by stating that women were paid less than their male counterparts on average due to them being "smaller, weaker and less intelligent", during a debate in the EP regarding the gender pay gap. Two days later, Korwin-Mikke made further comments stating that there was a stereotype that "women have the same intellectual potential as men” and it “must be destroyed because it is not true.”

The situations described above, that took place in the gender pay gap debate, culminated in a court hearing. On 31 May 2018 European General Court in the Case T‑352/17 Korwin-Mikke v Parliament lifted sanctions from 14 March 2017 imposed on Korwin Mikke by the President of the Parliament, under which he was suspended for ten days from the plenary sessions of the EP. The Court in Case T-352/17 described interpretation of the provisions of the Rules of Procedure made by the President of the European Parliament and the Bureau of the Parliament, which was the basis for imposing sanctions on Korwin-Mikke, as leading to "an arbitrary restriction of the freedom of expression of MEPs".

In 2020, a Polish court overturned a rape conviction because while the victim stated it was non-consensual, she did not scream. Korwin-Mikke was one of the few voices supporting the ruling, saying on Twitter, "If they don’t scream, it shows they want it," and "This criterion has worked for 6,000 years," drawing criticism.

Allegations of racism 
In 2014, Korwin-Mikke was fined by President of the European Parliament Martin Schulz for 'expressing himself in a racist manner'. The decision was taken after his speech about EU employment policy on the plenary session on 16 July, during which he said (in English): 'we have 20 million Europeans who are now negroes of Europe'. According to him the word 'negroes' was not meant as an offence, but rather referred to the song by John Lennon and Yoko Ono 'Woman is the Nigger of the world'.

Allegations of homophobia and transphobia 
During an interview with Rzeczpospolita, Korwin-Mikke expressed support for prohibiting "homosexual propaganda" in schools, as well as prohibiting the organization of Equality Marches. He claimed that "one must slaughter" those who promote gay rights.

Korwin-Mikke described Anna Grodzka, the first trans woman to be a member of Parliament in Poland, as a male when stating that Grodzka "extorted his seat in the Sejm by impersonating a woman."

Allegations of Islamophobia and antisemitism 
He stated that the best way to deal with Muslims in Europe would be to keep them out, ban them from building mosques, and "if need be, oppose them militarily”.

Korwin-Mikke has a history of antisemitic stunts and statements. He objected to the Polish government's decision to bar Holocaust denier David Irving from entering Poland. He promoted a conspiracy theory on Jews while commenting on media reports about a custom in which residents of the town of Pruchnik beat with sticks the effigy of an Orthodox Jew. In 2020, while making comments on the COVID-19 pandemic, he stated that anti-Jewish pogroms made Jews powerful via natural selection and that rabbis may have engineered this. Korwin-Mikke denies being an antisemite.

Allegations of ableism 
During the 2012 Summer Paralympics, Korwin-Mikke wrote that the general public should "not see the disabled on television". On the other hand, in 2007, he set up the "Individual Development Foundation" which helps disabled people develop their skills in chess.

Endorsement of conspiracy theories 
On 15 April 2015, the Polish news outlet Wiadomości quoted Korwin-Mikke that the snipers that shot civilians and police officers during the Maidan protests were trained in Poland and that they acted on behalf of the CIA to provoke riots. Other provocative statements include Korwin-Mikke's claim that there is no written proof that Adolf Hitler was aware of the Holocaust.

Criticism of the European Union 
Korwin-Mikke proposed that the European Commission's Berlaymont building would be better used as a brothel. In July 2015, he was suspended from the EP after giving a Nazi salute and saying "ein Reich, ein Volk, ein Ticket" during a speech to protest against a uniform EU transport ticket. Following the beginning of protests in Belarus, Korwin made a statement praising Belarusian president Alexander Lukashenko as a hero for his opposition to the EU.

Criticism of social welfare  
In regard to welfare, Korwin-Mikke claimed that "if someone gives money to an unemployed person, he should have his hand cut off because he is destroying the morale of the people".

On 8 September 2015, Korwin-Mikke was giving a speech in EP about the European migrant crisis, during which he described immigrants unwilling to work and only interested in welfare as "human garbage". His opinion met with critical reaction of other MEPs. As a result of this, Korwin-Mikke was once more suspended from the EP for ten days and fined €3062.

Support for Russia and criticism of Ukraine 
Janusz Korwin-Mikke has been described as supporting Russia on a number of occasions since the 2010s. This is evidenced by his statements supporting the Russian annexation of Crimea, his official trip to the peninsula, as well as claims whitewashing Russian history and actions, and criticizing Ukraine. He appeared on Russian television as a Polish politician opposing alleged Polish “Russophobia”. Also after the 2022 Russia's invasion of Ukraine, he often uttered pro-Russian content, denying Russian responsibility for the massacre in Bucha by claiming that the Ukrainians murdered wartime collaborators, criticizing the imposition of sanctions against Russia because of the negative economic impacts of the sanctions, especially in regards to the dispute about deliveries of natural gas, suggesting that both Ukrainian heroism and Russian determination should be admired, since the Ukrainian side is receiving a substantial military support, giving it an advantage in the war, and even claiming that after the war, Ukraine may attack Poland due to Ukrainian irredentist claims on Przemyśl, Chełm, Rzeszów, Gorlice and Tarnów.

Publications
Selected works by JKM:
	
 Brydż (Bridge), 1976
 Program Liberałów (Liberals' Program(me)), 1979 – Program(me) of a future libertarian-conservative party. 
 Ubezpieczenia (Insurances), 1979 – Critical analysis/evaluation of  state-provided social insurances.	
 Katechizm robotnika liberała (Catechism of a liberal worker), 1979 – Explanatory brochure ("FAQ") about the basic tenets of economic liberalism, aimed at the working class.	
 Bez impasu. Elementy logiki i psychologii w brydżu (Without impasse/finesse. Elements of logic and psychology in bridge), 1980	
 Brydż dla początkujących (Bridge for beginners), 1980
 Gospodarka po sierpniu 1980, czyli co proponuje P. Józef Pińkowski (Economic system after the Gdańsk Agreement, a word about Sir Józef Pińkowski's proposals), 1980 – Critical analysis/evaluation of a socialist economy, as well as the economic policies of Solidarity movement and the ruling government. 
 Historia i zmiana (History and change), 1982 – On evolution of political systems and their economies. 
 JK-M vs. NN (JKM vs. Anonymous reader), 1985 – Brochure of JKM's polemics with an anonymous reader. 
 Liberum veto, 1986 	
 Brydż sportowy (Sport's bridge), 1986 	
 Ratujmy państwo (Let's Save the Country), 1990
 Nie tylko o Żydach (Not Only About Jews), 1991 – About inter-Polish politics. 
 Prowokacja? (Provocation?), 1991 – Combined feuilletons from years 1980–1990, originally published in "Gazeta Handlowa" in the city of  Poznań.  	
 Vademecum ojca (Father's vademecum), 1991 – Aimed at the young fathers on how to raise one's children. 
 "Rząd rżnie głupa" – czyli mowy sejmowe (The government is playing dumb – Sejm speeches), 1993
 Wizja parlamentu w nowej konstytucji Rzeczypospolitej Polskiej (Vision of parliament within the new constitution of a Polish Republic), 1994
 Kara śmierci (Death penalty), 1995 – Analytical, pro-capital punishment brochure.
 U progu wolności (At the doorstep of freedom/liberty), 1995 – Combined feuilletons from years 1981–1995, originally published in various sources. 
 Niebezpieczne ubezpieczenia (Dangerous insurances), 2000 – Critical analysis/evaluation of insurances and their negative influences on society's progress. 
 Ekonomikka (Economikks), 2001 – Combined feuilletons on economic subjects, chosen by Zdzisław Kościelak. 
 Rok 2007 (Year 2007), 2001 – An account of fictional letters that JKM would write and send to the world's leaders once elected and in power. 	
 Dekadencja (Decadence), 2002	
 Naprawić Polskę, no problem (To fix Poland? No problem!), 2004
 Podatki – Czyli rzecz o grabieży (Taxes – byword for robbery), 2004 – Critical analysis/evaluation of state-imposed taxes, with a focus on Poland. 
 Kto tu dymi? (Who is raising a fuss here?), 2007
 Rusofoby w odwrocie (Russophobes in retreat), 2009 – Analysis and criticism of Polish foreign policy, with focus on Eastern Europe (Belarus, Ukraine, Russia). 
 Świat według Korwina (World according to Korwin), 2012 – Combined feuilletons.  	
 Europa według Korwina (Europe according to Korwin), 2016 – Combined feuilletons, strong criticism of European Union.

References

 Sejm website on his first cadency

External links

 Janusz Korwin Mikke's site  
 Janusz Korwin-Mikke's blog 
 Janusz Korwin-Mikke's official Facebook page 

1942 births
Living people
Writers from Warsaw
Members of the Polish Sejm 1991–1993
Members of the Polish Sejm 2019–2023
Polish bloggers
Male bloggers
University of Warsaw alumni
Polish monarchists
Candidates in the 1995 Polish presidential election
Candidates in the 2000 Polish presidential election
Candidates in the 2005 Polish presidential election
Candidates in the 2010 Polish presidential election
Candidates in the 2015 Polish presidential election
Male critics of feminism
Polish contract bridge players
Confederation Liberty and Independence politicians
Congress of the New Right politicians
Polish anti-communists
Libertarian economists
Libertarian theorists
Anti-Islam sentiment in Poland
MEPs for Poland 2014–2019
Paleolibertarianism
Polish libertarians
Far-right politics in Poland
Polish conspiracy theorists